Scythris anomaloptera is a moth of the family Scythrididae. It was described by Otto Staudinger in 1880. It is found in France, Spain, Bulgaria, Greece, southern European Russia and Turkey.

References

anomaloptera
Moths described in 1880